Chorobates Rock is the rock off the NW coast of northwest coast of Nelson Island in the South Shetland Islands, Antarctica extending 83 m in south–north direction and 55 m in west–east direction. Its surface area is 0.25 ha. The vicinity was visited by early 19th century sealers.

The feature is named after the chorobates, an ancient Roman device for measuring slopes; in association with other names in the area deriving from the early development or use of geodetic instruments and methods.

Location
British mapping in 1968.

See also
 List of Antarctic and subantarctic islands

Maps
 Livingston Island to King George Island. Scale 1:200000.  Admiralty Nautical Chart 1776.  Taunton: UK Hydrographic Office, 1968.
 South Shetland Islands. Scale 1:200000 topographic map No. 3373. DOS 610 - W 62 58. Tolworth, UK, 1968.
Antarctic Digital Database (ADD). Scale 1:250000 topographic map of Antarctica. Scientific Committee on Antarctic Research (SCAR). Since 1993, regularly upgraded and updated.

References

 Bulgarian Antarctic Gazetteer. Antarctic Place-names Commission. (details in Bulgarian, basic data in English)

External links
 Chorobates Rock. Adjusted Copernix satellite image

Rock formations of the South Shetland Islands
Bulgaria and the Antarctic